Blake Baxter (born 1963) is an American techno musician, associated with the first wave of Detroit techno. AllMusic called him "perhaps the most underrated figure" of the early Detroit techno scene.

Baxter was born in Detroit, Michigan, United States, and first began mixing records in the middle of the 1980s. Some of his first releases were recorded in Chicago on the label DJ International, which was later remixed and released in Detroit on the record label KMS Records, KMS-011, also in Detroit. He released music on the Underground Resistance label, including an EP 12-inch vinyl The Prince of Techno UR-06 in the late 1980s and early 1990s. He also had several of his productions featured on the Techno! The New Dance Sound of Detroit compilation. Around 1989-92, he released three 12 inch records on Incognito Records.

While touring in Germany in Berlin, he released One More Time on Tresor Records and "Brothers Gonna Work it Out" on Logic Records in Frankfurt; a track based on Willie Hutch's 1973 eponymous release, which was later sampled by The Chemical Brothers. After returning to Detroit, he set up the labels Mix Records and Phat Joint and opened a record store in downtown Detroit called Save the Vinyl from 1992 to 1999.

Discography

Work Jack Master 2 compilation album DJ International Westside Records  
In This House We Jack Jack Master 4 compilation album DJ International Westside Records
When We Used to Play EP KMS Records, 1987
"Forever and a day", Techno! The New Dance Sound of Detroit album compilation (Virgin 10 Records), 1988
"Ride em Boy", Techno! The New Dance Sound of Detroit album compilation (Virgin 10 Records), 1988
Sexuality  Incognito Records, 1989
The Crimes of the Heart EP Incognito Records, 1990
The Prince of Techno EP Underground Resistance Records, 1991
One More Time Tresor Records, 1992
Brothers Gonna Work it Out Logic Records, 1993
The Vault (Disko B, 1995)
The H Factor (Hurricane Melt) (Disko B, 1997)
A Decade Underground DJ Mix (Tresor Records, 1998)
Dream Sequence (Tresor, 2000)
Dream Sequence 3 (Tresor, 2001)

References

External links
 Blake Baxter discography at Discogs.

American techno musicians
African-American musicians
Musicians from Detroit
Living people
1963 births
21st-century African-American people
20th-century African-American people